Neodrassex is a genus of South American ground spiders that was first described by R. Ott in 2012.

Species
 it contains five species:
Neodrassex aureus Ott, 2012 (type) – Brazil, Argentina
Neodrassex cachimbo Ott, 2013 – Brazil
Neodrassex ibirapuita Ott, 2013 – Brazil
Neodrassex iguatemi Ott, 2012 – Brazil
Neodrassex nordeste Ott, 2013 – Brazil

References

Araneomorphae genera
Gnaphosidae
Spiders of Brazil